Bury Transport Museum is a transport museum in Bury, Greater Manchester, situated in the former Castlecroft Goods Warehouse, a Grade II listed building from 1846, on Castlecroft Road, with the main entrance from Bolton Street, BL9 0EY.

It was started in 1973 by volunteers of the East Lancashire Railway, had to close in 2003 because of roof problems but opened again in 2010.

See also

Listed buildings in Bury

References

Grade II listed buildings in the Metropolitan Borough of Bury
Museums in Greater Manchester
Transport museums in England
History of transport in Greater Manchester